There are several locations named Adamkhan:

Adamkhan, Armenia, a village
De Adam Khan, a village in Helmand Province, Afghanistan